Ch'ura (Quechua for a swamp with natural springs, Hispanicized name Churas) is a  mountain in the Andes of Peru. It is located in the Lima Region, Cajatambo Province, Gorgor District, and in the Huaura Province, Ambar District. Ch'ura lies northwest of Wanki and northeast of Waqra Punta at the end of the Phiru Uya valley.

References

Mountains of Peru
Mountains of Lima Region